Claston Bernard (born 22 March 1979 in St. Elizabeth) is a Jamaican-American decathlete. He won Commonwealth Gold in 2002. His personal best in decathlon is 8290 points, achieved in May 2005 in Götzis.

Bernard ran track collegiately at Louisiana State University.

In 2021, Bernard ran for the United States House of Representatives as a Republican in Louisiana's second congressional district, coming in fourth place with 9.8% of the vote.

Achievements

External links

Claston Bernard for Congress

1979 births
Living people
Athletes (track and field) at the 2000 Summer Olympics
Athletes (track and field) at the 2002 Commonwealth Games
Athletes (track and field) at the 2010 Commonwealth Games
Athletes (track and field) at the 2004 Summer Olympics
Athletes (track and field) at the 2011 Pan American Games
Candidates in the 2021 United States elections
Commonwealth Games gold medallists for Jamaica
Commonwealth Games medallists in athletics
Jamaican decathletes
Louisiana Republicans
LSU Tigers track and field athletes
Olympic athletes of Jamaica
Pan American Games competitors for Jamaica
People from Saint Elizabeth Parish
Medallists at the 2002 Commonwealth Games